John Baron Dutton, 2nd Baron Sherborne (24 January 1779 – 18 October 1862), was a British peer.

Background
Sherborne was the son of James Dutton, 1st Baron Sherborne, of Sherborne, Gloucestershire, by his wife Elizabeth Coke (1753–1824), daughter of Wenman Coke and Elizabeth Chamberlayne.

According to the Legacies of British Slave-Ownership at the University College London, Dutton was awarded a payment as a slave trader in the aftermath of the Slavery Abolition Act 1833 with the Slave Compensation Act 1837. The British Government took out a £15 million loan (worth £ in ) with interest from Nathan Mayer Rothschild and Moses Montefiore which was subsequently paid off by the British taxpayers (ending in 2015). Dutton was associated with "T71/854 St John No. 64A", he owned 464 slaves in Jamaica and received a £3,579 payment at the time (worth £ in ).

Family
Lord Sherborne married Mary Legge (1780–1864), daughter of Henry Bilson-Legge, 2nd Baron Stawell and Mary Curzon, on 11 August 1803. 

They had six children:
James Dutton, 3rd Baron Sherborne (1804–1883), married firstly his cousin Lady Elizabeth Howard (1803–1845), daughter of Thomas Howard, 16th Earl of Suffolk, and Elizabeth Jane Dutton, and secondly Susan Block (1829–1907), daughter of James Block.
Mary Esther Dutton (1805–1806).
Elizabeth Dutton (1807–1865), married Henry Reynolds-Moreton, 2nd Earl of Ducie.
John Thomas Dutton (1810–1884), married Lady Lavinia Parker (1816-1893), daughter of Thomas Parker, 5th Earl of Macclesfield. John Thomas Dutton was the grandfather of Ralph Dutton, 8th Baron Sherborne.
Anne Constance Dutton (1816–1858), married Admiral Edward Plunkett, 16th Lord Dunsany (1808–1889).
Ralph Heneage Dutton (1821–1892), married Isabella Mansfield (1826–1895), daughter of John Mansfield and sister of William Mansfield, 1st Baron Sandhurst.

Lord Sherborne died on 18 October 1862, aged 83, and was succeeded in the barony by his son, James. Lady Sherborne died in October 1864.

References

1779 births
1862 deaths
John
Recipients of payments from the Slavery Abolition Act 1833
British slave owners